Hichma is a small town in Achham District in the Seti Zone of western Nepal. At the time of the 1991 Nepal census, the town had a population of 3964 living in 727 houses. At the time of the 2001 Nepal census, the population was 4464, of which 28% was literate.

References

Populated places in Achham District
Village development committees in Achham District